Sağmalcılar is a rapid transit station on the M1 line of the Istanbul Metro. It is located in central Bayrampaşa, adjacent to the O-3 highway. Sağmalcılar was opened on 3 September 1989 as part of the first rapid transit line in Istanbul as well as Turkey and is one of the six original stations of the M1 line.

Layout

References

Railway stations opened in 1989
1989 establishments in Turkey
Istanbul metro stations
Bayrampaşa